Carl Fleischer may refer to:

 Carl Gustav Fleischer (1883–1942), Norwegian general 
 Carl August Fleischer (born 1936), Norwegian jurist